Wan Ok Phansa (literally "day of going out of Vassa", ออก in Thai meaning exit or leave) is the last day of the Thai-Lao observance of Vassa. It occurs in October, three lunar months after the beginning of Vassa, known as Wan Khao Phansa.

The day is celebrated in Isan by illuminated boat processions ( lai ruea fai,  lai huea fai), notably in Nakhon Phanom Province on the Mekong and in Ubon Ratchathani on the Mun River.

The main ceremonies feature boats of 8–10 metres in length, formerly made of banana wood or bamboo but now sometimes of other materials.  The boats  are filled with offerings such as khao tom (glutinous rice sweets wrapped in banana leaves) and decorated on the outside with flowers, candles and lamps. The boats are launched in the evening.

Additionally, some celebrants individually launch their own, smaller, vessels. Boat races also take place around this time in many places throughout the country as a way to please the Nāga spirits.
Along the Mekong River, people launch little hot air balloons, acting as a lanterns, around the night of Wan Ok Phansa.

Launching the boats (or the lanterns) symbolizes your wishes but also getting rid of unnecessary negative feelings.

Etymology

"Wan" means "day", "Ok" means "to exit; to leave", and Phansa is the Thai word for Vassa.

Dates for Wan Ok Phansa

See also
Asalha Puja
Kathina
Pavarana
Uposatha
Ubon Ratchathani Candle Festival
Tak Bat Devo
Chak Phra
Festival of Floral Offerings
Thadingyut Festival, its equivalent in Myanmar
Tazaungdaing Festival

References

Buddhist holidays
October observances
Observances set by the Thai lunar calendar
Buddhist festivals in Thailand
Boat festivals
Observances held on the full moon
Buddhist festivals in Myanmar